Lac Agile (Mascouche) Airport  is located  north northwest of Mascouche, Quebec, Canada.

See also
 List of airports in the Montreal area

References

Registered aerodromes in Lanaudière
Transport in Mascouche